Powerhead may refer to:

 Powerhead (firearm), a direct-contact, underwater firearm
 Powerhead (aquarium), a submersible aquarium pump 
 Powerhead (rocket engine), the preburners and turbopumps of a pump-fed rocket engine (excludes the engine combustion chamber and nozzle)
 Powerhead (pump), the mechanical drive of any one of several non-aquarium pump types; marine propeller powerhead, fountain powerhead, etc.